Saint-Pierre-d'Allevard (literally Saint-Pierre of Allevard) is a former commune in the Isère department in southeastern France. On 1 January 2016, it was merged into the new commune of Crêts-en-Belledonne.

Population

See also
Communes of the Isère department

References

Former communes of Isère
Isère communes articles needing translation from French Wikipedia